Gran Hermano Colombia is a reality television series produced by Endemol. It has had a total of 2 seasons and has no plan to have another series. The first season aired in 2003 on Caracol TV.

Season 1
 Start Date: 27 July 2003.
 End Date: 10 November 2003.
 Duration: 106 days.
 Prize: 250,000,000 pesos.
 Main Presenters: Adriana Arango & Carlos Calero.
 The Finalists: Mónica (The Winner), Juan Carlos (Runner-up) & Román (2nd Runner-up).
 Evicted Housemates: Ana María, Andrea, Andrés, Arcenia, Camilo, Carlos, Carolina, John Henry, Lina, Luis, María, Patricia & Ramón.
 Ejected Housemates: Clara.

Nominations table

Season 2

Gran Hermano 2 (also be known as Gran Hermano 2012 por Citytv by the network) was the second season of Gran Hermano in Colombia. The season launched on Monday 20 August 2012. Nomination Day was set for Thursdays and Eviction was set for Tuesdays.

The series used different rules compare to its first season. Each week the housemates nominated two people for eviction with the two or more housemates receiving the most votes will face eviction and could be evicted.

The phone
The phone rings from time to time where the housemate who answers will either face a good or bad consequence. In Week 1, Juan answered the phone and automatically faced eviction.
In week two, on the nomination night, after everyone had voted the phone rang, Alejandro answered and Big Brother asked him to point with his finger a housemate; Farid was chosen. Later the consequence was known, Farid was immune that week (despite that he did not get any vote that day).

Housemates

Guest

 Agustín Belforte is a former housemate of Gran Hermano 4 (Argentina). He was evicted on Day 42, with 42.5% of the votes to evict. He entered in the House on Day 45, and left the house in Day 72 minutes before Juan's eviction.

Nominations table
The first person a housemate nominates is for 2 points, whilst the second nomination is for just 1 point.

Notes
 :  Juan is the first nominee because he answered the phone.
 :  Instantaneous Nomination gives one extra point for each nomination, thus, the first person a housemate nominates is for 3 points, whilst the second is for 2 points. This tool can only be used once a week by the first one who request it.
 :  Diana answered the phone and chose Claudia to be nominated.
 : Camila, Farid and Juan votes were canceled, because they sang their nominations.
 : Percentages to re-enter: Dayana (51.23%), None (22.66%), Paola (10.59%), Aura (5.91%), Rafael (4.68%), Nini (2.96%), More than one (1.97%).

Nomination totals received

References

External links

Colombia
2003 Colombian television series debuts
2012 Colombian television series endings
2003 Colombian television seasons
Colombian reality television series